Barry Steven Cowsill (September 14, 1954 –  September 2, 2005) was an American musician and member of the musical group the Cowsills.

Career

Cowsill was born in Newport, Rhode Island, the fifth of seven children. As a teenager, he became the drummer (and later the bass guitar player) of the band initially formed by his brothers Bill and Bob Cowsill, playing popular tunes at local dance clubs. By the late 1960s, the band expanded to include younger brother John (on drums), his mother Barbara, older brother Paul, and younger sister Susan. The Cowsills went on to churn out a string of hits (including the #2's "The Rain the Park and Other Things" and "Hair") before officially disbanding by 1972.

After the group broke up, Cowsill moved frequently and worked various jobs including construction and waiting tables. For a time, Cowsill owned a bar in Austin which he admitted he lost because he "drank it dry. I was drinking my face off in those days." Throughout his life, he continued to play music and participated in various post-heyday incarnations of the Cowsills. In 1998, he released his first solo CD, As Is. In 2002, he relocated to his hometown of Newport, Rhode Island. In 2005, Cowsill relocated again to New Orleans. Shortly before his death, he had made plans to enter a Los Angeles rehab facility to seek help for his alcoholism. His flight to Los Angeles had been scheduled for August 28, but those plans were stymied when Hurricane Katrina hit the city on August 29.

Personal life
In 1987, Cowsill married Deborah Scott with whom he had two children (he also had an older daughter). Cowsill and his wife were divorced in 2003.

Death
On August 29, 2005, Hurricane Katrina hit the city of New Orleans. Cowsill, who chose not to evacuate, weathered the storm in an abandoned warehouse. Cowsill survived the storm but was in need of help. He called his sister Susan from a pay phone (Susan also lived in New Orleans with her family but chose to evacuate) and left four voice mail messages saying he was surrounded by looters and people shooting. Susan Cowsill did not receive the messages until September 2. Cowsill was never heard from again. After an extensive search, Cowsill's body was found under a wharf on the Mississippi River on December 28, 2005. His body was subsequently identified by comparison to dental records. Cowsill's death was attributed to drowning as a result of the flooding following Hurricane Katrina.

The Cowsill family held two memorials for Barry in Newport and New Orleans.

See also
List of people who disappeared

References

External links
Barry Cowsill at Cowsill.com
The Cowsills - Newspaper articles

1954 births
2000s missing person cases
2005 deaths
20th-century American bass guitarists
20th-century American drummers
20th-century American singers
20th-century American male singers
American child musicians
American child singers
American keyboardists
American male bass guitarists
American male drummers
American pop rock musicians
American pop rock singers
Deaths by drowning in the United States
Deaths in floods
Deaths in tropical cyclones
Guitarists from Louisiana
Guitarists from Rhode Island
Missing person cases in Louisiana
Musicians from New Orleans
Natural disaster deaths in Louisiana
Singers from Louisiana
Singers from Rhode Island
The Cowsills members
Formerly missing people